Suicide in Pakistan is a major public health issue.

Comparison 
Pakistan's suicide rate is above the worldwide average. The 2015 global rate was 89.5 per 100,000 people (in 2008, 15.6). Suicides represent some 0.9% of all deaths.

Pakistan's death rate, as given by the World Bank, is 7.28 per 1000 people in 2015. In 2015, the  suicide rate in Pakistan was approximately 16 deaths per 100,000 inhabitants, nearly 1 and a half times  the global average. Similarly, suicides represent 9.7% of all deaths.

Culture 
Diagnosing and covering suicide cases is generally difficult due to social stigma and legal issues that envelop the problem. Suicide is prohibited in Islam. Various obstacles restrict open discussion of the phenomenon.

Suicide is a criminal offence under the Pakistan Penal Code, with punitive laws imposed for attempted suicide punishable by a fine of Rs10,000 and/or imprisonment.

National suicide statistics are not compiled on a formal level nor officially reported to the World Health Organization. Unofficial data is neglected and subject to underreporting. While suicide patterns have traditionally been low, the rate has increased steeply.

One analysis of suicide reports over a period of two years, showed over 300 suicide deaths in Pakistan in 35 different cities. The findings showed that males outnumber females by a 2:1 rate, and that the majority of male suicides tended to be unmarried; the rate for females is the opposite. Research indicated that the majority of female suicides were under age 30 and that "domestic problems" were the main stated reason. These include unemployment, health issues, poverty, homelessness, family disputes, depression and a range of social pressures.

Hanging, use of insecticides, and firearms are the most common methods for carrying out suicide in Pakistan.

References

 
Health in Pakistan